Gold Souk Grandé is a shopping mall, in the city of Chennai, India. The project was unveiled in April 2009 by actress Shobana. It is located next to Crescent Engineering College in Chennai and will be operational by first quarter of 2015. This is creating a record for itself by becoming the longest project in gestation period and construction period.

Pizza Hut was operating on the ground floor but has been replaced by Papa John's pizza.

The mall is part of the Gold Souk chain of malls located throughout India and is a brand of Gurgaon-based retail and property developer, Aerens Gold Souk Group. The Gold Souk Grande Chennai is Arena Group's first venture in Tamil Nadu.

References

Shopping malls in Chennai
Shopping malls established in 2015
2015 establishments in Tamil Nadu